S.S.D. Gallipoli Football 1909 is an Italian association football club, based in Gallipoli, Apulia.

History

AC Gallipoli 
The club was founded in 1999 as Associazione Calcio Gallipoli to represent the town of Gallipoli from the province of Lecce. The club quickly rose up the Italian football system, being one of the two who were promoted from Eccellenza Apulia in 2003–04.

After gaining a promotion during their first ever season in Serie D, the club changed its name to Gallipoli Calcio in 2005. Gallipoli then completed it by winning a third consecutive promotion to Serie C1, and making their absolute debut in the Italian third-highest level in the 2006–07 season, which ended in a mid-table place. Former Serie A star Dario Bonetti was then chosen as new boss for the 2007–08 season; he was however sacked later following disagreements with the board, in spite of impressive performances which gave the team a third place in the table. The club ultimately ended the season in ninth place, well below their initial expectations. Former AS Roma playing hero Giuseppe Giannini was successively appointed as new head coach for Gallipoli's 2008–09 campaign, which ended in triumph, as the giallorossi won a historic first promotion to Serie B as league winners in the final week.

In July 2009, the club's future was put in doubt when President of the club, oil businessman and Senator Vincenzo Barba, announced that the club was up for sale at no cost. In addition, their home stadium (Stadio Antonio Bianco) was declared unfit as Serie B venue, so the club will be forced to play home games at the Via del Mare in Lecce. The situation seriously hampered their preparations for their first season in Serie B and the club was forced to play with its under-19 squad for their Coppa Italia second round match versus Lumezzane in which they were soundly beaten in a 6–0 defeat. With only two weeks before the start of the league, only four first team players were still under contract and no pre-season training camp was organized and no head coach was appointed yet.

On 11 August 2009 an Udine-based company called "D'Odorico Group" took over the club from Barba, putting an end to weeks of speculation regarding the future of the club. The new owner confirmed Giannini as coach. Despite being underdogs, Gallipoli managed to earn 28 points, thus ending the first half of the season in 11th place, but the situation crumbled in the second leg. Giannini resigned on 22 March 2010 after the club regularly failed to pay salaries to its players. After a two-game tenure under youth team coach Giovanni De Pasquale, former Triestina, Torino and Treviso boss Ezio Rossi was appointed. The change did not have any effect, as Gallipoli were relegated back to the third tier on 16 May 2010. The club had severe financial issues, and this caused at first the inability to request the admission to the Italian third tier (30 June 2010). The club owed Luca Pasqualin of P.D.P. srl for agent fee of €12,000 for signing Piergiuseppe Maritato and upheld by Tribunale Nazionale di Arbitrato per lo Sport of CONI.

Then, in July 2010, a court in Lecce declared the club bankrupt.

ASD Gallipoli Football 1909 
A new club called A.S.D. Gallipoli Football 1909 was founded on 13 July 2010. Its goal is entering Promozione, the 2nd tier of amatorial Italian football. The first season (2010–2011) finished with Gallipoli that reached the 3° place in graduatory, and then they lose the play-off to be promoted in Eccellenza Apulia. Gallipoli finished 3rd Group B of Promozione Apulia and again lost promotion play-offs. But the club admitted to Eccellenza Apulia later. Gallipoli finished 7th in 2012–13 season. Finally Gallipoli won Eccellenza Apulia in 2013–14 season and promoted to Group H of Serie D. After two seasons in Italian Serie D and after many societary changes, the team downgrades again in Eccellenza Apulia in 2015–16.

Managerial history

Honours 
Lega Pro Prima Divisione: 1
 Winners: 2008–09

Supercoppa di Lega Pro Prima Divisione: 1
 Winners: 2009

Serie C2: 1
 Winners: 2005–06

Coppa Italia Serie C: 1
 Winners: 2005–06

Serie D:
 Promoted: 2004–05

Eccellenza Apulia: 2
 Winners: 2003–04, 2013–14

References 

 
Football clubs in Apulia
Gallipoli, Apulia
Association football clubs established in 1999
Serie B clubs
Serie C clubs
Serie D clubs
Eccellenza
Promozione
1999 establishments in Italy
2010 establishments in Italy
Phoenix clubs (association football)
Coppa Italia Serie C winning clubs